Abercrombie Anstruther Lawson  (13 September 1870 – 26 March 1927) was a botanist, foundation professor of botany at the University of Sydney.

Early life
Lawson was born in Hamilton, Ontario, Canada, the fourth son of William Lawson, a sailor and shipyard worker, and his wife Janet (Jessie) Kerr, née Coupar. Abercrombie Lawson's parents had migrated to Hamilton in 1866, then in 1881 moved to Toronto, where Lawson was educated at the Harbord Street Collegiate Institute. When Lawson's father's health failed, his mother wrote novels and worked as a journalist to educate the ten children. After a year at the University of Toronto, Lawson claimed to have studied medicine and botany at the University of Glasgow, Scotland, in 1895-96. Lawson graduated at the University of California, Berkeley (Bachelor of Science, 1897; Master of Science, 1898). After a year as assistant in botany Lawson spent 1901 at the University of Chicago with Professors John Merle Coulter and Charles Joseph Chamberlain in the new Hull laboratories and was awarded a PhD (1901).

Career
Lawson returned to California and spent five years teaching at Stanford University under Professor D. H. Campbell. Lawson was appointed lecturer in botany at the University of Glasgow in 1907 and in 1910 was awarded D.Sc. for papers on the special morphology of the Coniferales. Lawson produced "Memoirs on Synapsis, Nuclear Osmosis and Chromosome Reduction", which appeared in the Transactions of the Royal Society of Edinburgh in 1911–12. In 1909 he was elected a Fellow of the Royal Society of Edinburgh. His proposers were Frederick Orpen Bower, Robert Kidston, Sir Isaac Bayley Balfour, and Ramsay Heatley Traquair. He won the Society's Makdougall-Brisbane Prize for the period 1916-1918.

In 1913 Lawson became foundation professor of botany at the University of Sydney. Lawson was well versed in and strongly committed to the theory of Evolution which was then revolutionizing comparative morphology, a major branch of botanical studies. His research interests, based on collections and observations made on major expeditions, contrasted with the more descriptive and less theoretical concerns of economic botany and traditional taxonomy which had dominated botanical research in Australia.

From the start at the University of Sydney, Lawson stressed laboratory work and urged for a new building to house his department. Insisting on adequate laboratory facilities, he rejected attempts to locate the department in the arts building and soon occupied a large part of the Macleay Museum. The onset of World War I delayed his plans but a new building, largely to his design and built on to the museum, was opened in 1925. Lawson also emphasized the importance of field excursions as a teaching technique, a long-hallowed tradition of Scottish universities. About 1925 Lawson formally introduced the study of ecology into the teaching program.

An entertaining lecturer and attentive to students, Lawson retained a close interest in teaching methods. While at Glasgow he had visited the principal European botanical institutions to study teaching methods and research techniques, and in 1923 visited several Canadian universities. His enthusiasm had its reward. Not long after his arrival in Sydney botany had become a major field of study within the university's science programme and by the early 1920s its first honours students had graduated.

By the 1920s Lawson had built up a very productive research team including John McLuckie and Patrick Brough, his former students from Glasgow. His main research interest was in the origin and evolution of gymnosperms, non-flowering seed-bearing plants such as conifers and cycads. Lawson promoted the study of native plants and joined the campaign which resulted in the Wildflowers and Native Plants Protection Act, 1927. His work on the origin and evolution of Australian flora was published posthumously by McLuckie.

Lawson's popular extension lectures on Australian flora were illustrated by lantern slides, made from photographs taken on many excursions. Lawson hand-coloured the slides using an exacting technique perfected by himself. A collection of 1000 slides was given to the university on his death. This artistic flair pervaded his private life, and he had a fine collection of antique furniture and English, French and Chinese porcelain, paintings (one by Turner) and etchings. He never married. According to an obituarist 'he treated women with a detached courtesy as of a celibate priest. For the friendship of men he had that genius which the old Greeks have idealised'. Lawson resided at the Australian Club and later at Potts Point, New South Wales.

A significant contribution to the knowledge of the gymnosperms, "The Life-History of Bowenia a genus of Cycads endemic in Australasia", was published in the Transactions of the Royal Society of Edinburgh, 1926. 
Lawson was a fellow of the Linnean societies of London and New South Wales, and of the Royal Society of Edinburgh (winning their Makdougall-Brisbane prize for 1916–18) and a member of the Royal Society of New South Wales. In 1926 the University of Adelaide conferred upon him an ad eundem D.Sc. Before his election as a fellow of the Royal Society, London, could be confirmed, Lawson died on 26 March 1927 in St Luke's Hospital, following an operation for a diseased gall bladder; he was buried in the Presbyterian section of South Head cemetery. His brother Andrew was professor of geology in 1899-1928 at the University of California. Another brother, James Kerr-Lawson, was a noted portrait painter and a portrait by him of A. A. Lawson hangs in the botany department, University of Sydney.

References

External links
Correspondence from Lawson

1870 births
1927 deaths
20th-century Canadian botanists
20th-century Australian botanists
People from Hamilton, Ontario
Fellows of the Royal Society of Edinburgh
Alumni of the University of Glasgow
Canadian people of Scottish descent
Australian people of Scottish descent